Dr. Minnita Daniel-Cox, an African-American soprano, founded the Dunbar Music Archive. She teaches at University of Dayton as the Assistant Professor of Voice and Voice Area Coordinator.

Education 
Daniel-Cox received her Bachelor of Music in Music Performance degree from Bowling Green State University. She received both her Master of Music and Doctorate of Musical Arts degrees from University of Michigan.

Scholarship 
Daniel-Cox's research regarding the musical settings of texts by poet and Dayton native, Paul Laurence Dunbar led to her establishment of the Dunbar Music Archive (DMA). She travels internationally lecturing about and performing excerpts from the archive.

Performance 
Daniel-Cox has performed with the Dayton Philharmonic Orchestra, the Springfield Symphony Orchestra, the Miami Valley Symphony Orchestra, the Bach Society of Dayton, and will return to perform with the Dayton Opera this fall as Anna Gomez in Menotti’s The Consul after her debut in 2014 as Sister Rose in Dead Man Walking.

References 

Year of birth missing (living people)
Living people
University of Dayton faculty
University of Michigan School of Music, Theatre & Dance alumni
Bowling Green State University alumni
American sopranos
American women academics
21st-century American women